"Cry for Help" is a song from Irish boyband HomeTown. The song was released in Ireland as a digital download on 27 March 2015 through Sony Music Entertainment. It was released as the second single from their self-titled debut studio album. The song peaked at number 1 on the Irish Singles Chart, as of 2020 the most recent Irish act to achieve the feat.

Reception
Sophie Bird from Flavour Mag said ""Cry for Help" is an exceptional song, proving these lads talents." adding it's one of her favourites from the album.

Music video
A music video to accompany the release of "Cry for Help" was first released onto YouTube on 26 March 2015 at a total length of three minutes and eleven seconds.

Track listing

Chart performance

Release history

References

Irish Singles Chart number-one singles
2015 singles
Pop ballads
2015 songs
Songs written by Tom Barnes (songwriter)
Songs written by Iain James
Songs written by Peter Kelleher (songwriter)
Songs written by Ben Kohn
Sony Music singles